Judge Walter (disambiguation) may refer to:

Donald Ellsworth Walter (born 1936), judge of the United States District Court for the Western District of Louisiana
John F. Walter (born 1944), judge of the United States District Court for the Central District of California